Poropuntius smedleyi is a species of cyprinid fish in the genus Poropuntius from the Malay Peninsula.

References 

smedleyi
Fish described in 1933
Taxa named by Lieven Ferdinand de Beaufort